The Glenn A. Black Laboratory of Archaeology (GBL) was an archaeology research center and museum located in Bloomington, Indiana. In 2020 the GBL was merged with the Mathers Museum of World Culture to become the new Indiana University Museum of Archaeology and Anthropology. The GBL was dedicated in honor of Indiana's first professional archaeologist Glenn A. Black. Black's adulthood was devoted to studying the people of Angel Mounds, a site that is still being worked with today.

History 
The museum was dedicated on April 21, 1971 at the request of Eli Lilly, a close friend of Glenn A. Black, who also endowed the GBL with funds.

Collections 
The Glenn A. Black Laboratory of Archaeology holds collections from all over Indiana, materials from 38 other states, and at least 11 other places outside of the United States are included.

Archaeological Collections 
Collections include over 5 million individual objects. Archaeological material includes cultural artifacts both from excavated sites and from donations, as well as natural and geologic collections from many different sites in the Midwest, including Angel Mounds. The Glenn A. Black Laboratory of Archaeology also has multiple type collections and a teaching collection for use by schools and tour groups.

Ethnohistory Collections 
The Great Lakes and Ohio Valley Ethnohistory Collection contains materials compiled by Erminie Wheeler-Voegelin. These materials describe the history and land usage of groups/tribes in the Ohio Valley and Great Lakes region from the 1600s until the late 1900s, and records the information gathered by the Indian Claims Commissions (ICC). According to the GBL's website, "This collection contains 469 linear feet of material and is available for use by researchers."

Image/Film Collections 
The Glenn A. Black Laboratory of Archaeology has an extensive image collection: it has over 12,000 photographs, 9,000 negatives, 8,200 slides, 50 glass plate images, and 100 16 mm film reels. These materials portray the history of archaeological work in the Midwest since the 1920s. Eli Lilly, Warren K. Moorehead, and Glenn A. Black are some of the professionals shown in these images and films.

Library/Archive Collections 
The library and archives located at the GBL are available for on-site research only.

James H. Kellar Library 
The James H. Kellar library contains books and other resources available for study. Some materials include: field excavation research reports, maps of individual sites in Indiana, documents conveying the history of the Glenn Black Laboratory of Archaeology, and many other books relating to archaeology.

Erminie Wheeler-Voegelin Archives 
These archives contain:
The Great Lakes-Ohio Valley Ethnohistory Collection
Eli LIlly Archaeology Papers
Glenn A. Black Papers
James H. Kellar Papers
Jack C. Householder Papers
Noel D. Justice Papers
Christopher S. Peebles Papers
Warren K. Moorehead Papers
Edward V. McMichael Papers
Douglas S. Byers Papers
Clifford Anderson Papers
George K. Neuman Papers
Sherri Hilgeman Papers
Midwest Archaeological Conference Records
Cheryl Munson Papers
Glenn A. Black Laboratory of Archaeology Institutional Records
Taken directly from the GBL's website.

GBL Fieldwork Archives 
The Glenn A. Black Laboratory's Fieldwork Archives hold maps, field books, excavation information, and more. Documents relating to Angel Mounds (1939-1965), CRM projects, GBL Field schools, donations, state and federal collections, and records for the Indiana Historical Society are included in this archive.

Midwest Lithic Repository 
The GBL's Lithic Raw Material Repository was constructed to create an easier understanding of raw materials from different regions. This repository records over 500 samples of lithics gathered from North America, specifically the Northwest region. Archaeologists, museums, and the government can use this collection to identify types of lithics and work on type collections.

References

External links
 Glenn A. Black Laboratory of Archaeology - official site

Native American museums in Indiana
Archaeological organizations
Indiana University
Buildings and structures in Bloomington, Indiana
Tourist attractions in Bloomington, Indiana
Museums in Monroe County, Indiana
Archaeological museums in the United States
History museums in Indiana
University museums in Indiana